The Tamil Nadu Small Industries Development Corporation Limited (TANSIDCO) is a state-agency of the state of Tamil Nadu, India established to promote small-scale industries in the state. It establishes industrial parks throughout the state, providing the necessary infrastructure for small-scale industries, gives-away government subsidies for the sector, and provides technical assistance for the new industries.industries refers to the secondary type of occupation. Tamil Nadu is ranked as second largest industrialized state after Maharashtra.

References

External links 
Official website

Economy of Tamil Nadu
State agencies of Tamil Nadu
State industrial development corporations of India
Small-scale industry in India
Year of establishment missing